Sue Malek (born October 29, 1951) is an American politician who served as a member of the Montana Senate for the 46th district from 2013 to 2021. Malek previously served as a member of the Montana House of Representatives for the 98th district from 2009 to 2013.

References

Living people
1951 births
Democratic Party members of the Montana House of Representatives
Democratic Party Montana state senators
Women state legislators in Montana
21st-century American politicians
21st-century American women politicians
People from Minot, North Dakota